Bohdan Kasian (born 14 December 1997) is a Ukrainian swimmer. He competed in the men's 50 metre backstroke event at the 2017 World Aquatics Championships.

References

1997 births
Living people
Ukrainian male swimmers
Place of birth missing (living people)
Male backstroke swimmers
21st-century Ukrainian people